The Harmony Chapel and Cemetery (also known as "Harmony Meeting House" or "Harmony Cemetery") are a historic church and cemetery in Harmony, Rhode Island, a village in Glocester.

Overview
The wood-frame chapel adjacent to the cemetery sits on US Route 44 west of Edgewood Drive. Built as a schoolhouse in c. 1830, it is one of the few Federal-style schoolhouses to survive in the state, and is probably the best-preserved of that period.  It was later (by 1870) converted for use as a meeting house (free chapel) for villagers.  Residents would occasionally hire ministers to speak and hold various Christian religious ceremonies.

The cemetery behind the chapel was used as a private cemetery by the Steere, Smith and other local families until opened for public use in 1878.

See also 

 National Register of Historic Places in Providence County, Rhode Island

References

External links
 Friends of Harmony Village information and pictures of the chapel
 Harmony and Glocester Historical Information
 
 
 

Churches completed in 1816
Properties of religious function on the National Register of Historic Places in Rhode Island
Churches in Providence County, Rhode Island
Chapels in the United States
Cemeteries on the National Register of Historic Places in Rhode Island
Buildings and structures in Glocester, Rhode Island
National Register of Historic Places in Providence County, Rhode Island
1816 establishments in Rhode Island